Patriarchate (patriarcheîon) is an ecclesiological term in Christianity, designating the office and jurisdiction of an ecclesiastical patriarch. 
According to Christian tradition three patriarchates were established by the apostles as apostolic sees in the 1st century: Rome, Antioch, and Alexandria. Constantinople was added in the 4th century and Jerusalem in the 5th century. Eventually, together, these five were recognised as the pentarchy by the Council of Ephesus in 431.

In the rest of the history of Christianity, a few other patriarchates were gradually recognised by any of these above ancient episcopal sees. With time, eventually some of them fell due to military occupations following the Islamic conquests of the Middle East and North Africa, and became titular or honorary patriarchates with no actual institutional jurisdiction on the original site.

History 

Five ancient patriarchates of the Pentarchy, headed by patriarchs as the highest-ranking bishops in the Christian Church prior to the East–West Schism, were the patriarchates of Rome, Constantinople, Alexandria, Antioch, and Jerusalem. The East-West Schism of 1054 split the Latin rite see of Rome from the four Byzantine rite patriarchates of the East, thus forming distinct Roman Catholic and Eastern Orthodox Churches.

The four Eastern Orthodox patriarchates (Constantinople, Alexandria, Antioch and Jerusalem), along with their Latin Catholic counterpart in the West, Rome, are distinguished as "senior" (Greek: πρεσβυγενή, presbygenē, "senior-born") or "ancient" (παλαίφατα, palèphata, "of ancient fame") and are among the apostolic sees, traditionally having had one of the apostles or evangelists as their first bishop: Andrew, Mark, Peter, James, and Peter again, respectively. In the case of Constantinople, Andrew is said to have visited the city of Byzantium in 38 AD (not Constantinople, as the Roman Emperor Constantine the Great had not yet declared Constantinople in 330 AD as the new capital of the Eastern Roman Empire on the grounds of the former city of Byzantium). According to tradition, Andrew appointed the bishop Stachys the Apostle who remained bishop in Byzantium until 54 AD. Therefore in the case of Constantinople the apostolic see is the See of Byzantium.

Catholic Church 
There are seven current patriarchates within the Catholic Church. Six are patriarchates of Eastern Catholic Churches: Alexandria (Coptic), Antioch (Maronite, Melkite, Syriac), Baghdad (Chaldean), and Cilicia (Armenian). The pope is effectively patriarch of the Latin Church, even if the title "Patriarch of the West" is no longer used. 

There are also four major archbishops, who operate as patriarch of their autonomous church, but for historical or procedural reasons are not recognized as a full patriarch. The main difference being that a patriarch's election is communicated to the pope, as a sign of communion between equals, but a major archbishop's election must be approved by the pope. 

In addition, there are four titular patriarchates - diocesan bishops whose dioceses have been given the honorific title of patriarchate for various historical reasons, but are not heads of autonomous churches sui iuris. These include the Latin Patriarchate of Jerusalem, of Lisbon, Venice and the East Indies.

Some of the Eastern Catholic patriarchates are active on the same territories. Damascus is the seat of the Syriac Catholic and the Melkite Catholic Patriarchates of Antioch, while the Maronite Catholic Patriarchate of Antioch has its see in Bkerké, Lebanon.

Eastern Orthodox Church 

Nine of the current autocephalous Eastern Orthodox Churches, including the four ancient churches of Constantinople, Alexandria, Antioch and Jerusalem mentioned above, are organized as patriarchates. In chronological order of establishment, the other five are: Bulgarian Patriarchate (the oldest one following the Pentarchy), Georgian Patriarchate, Serbian Patriarchate, Russian Patriarchate and Romanian Patriarchate.

The Eastern Orthodox Patriarchate of Antioch moved its headquarters to Damascus in the 13th century, during the reign of the Egyptian Mamelukes, conquerors of Syria. Christian community had flourished in Damascus since apostolic times (Acts 9). However, the patriarchate is still called the Patriarchate of Antioch.

A patriarchate has "legal personality" in some legal jurisdictions, that means it is treated as a corporation. For example, the Eastern Orthodox Patriarchate of Jerusalem filed a lawsuit in New York, decided in 1999, against Christie's Auction House, disputing the ownership of the Archimedes Palimpsest.

Oriental Orthodoxy 
There are several patriarchates within Oriental Orthodoxy. These include the four ancient churches of Alexandria, Jerusalem (Armenian), Antioch, and Constantinople (Armenian). Two other patriarchates have been established: the Ethiopian Patriarchate and the Eritrean Patriarchate. In addition, there are a number of autocephalous churches which function as patriarchates although not using the title: the Indian Orthodox Church, the Armenian Catholicosate of Etchmiadzin, and the Armenian Catholicosate of Cilicia.

Church of the East
Patriarch of the Church of the East is the head of the Church of the East. Today, there are three rival patriarchs: 
Catholicos-Patriarch of the Assyrian Church of the East
Catholicos Patriarch of the Ancient Church of the East
 Chaldean Catholic patriarch of Baghdad (of the Catholic church)

Protestantism
The head of the Czechoslovak Hussite Church is also called a Patriarch.

Apostolic Catholic Church 
The Patriarch of the Apostolic Catholic Church is called a Patriarch.

See also 
 Holy See
 Patriarch of Alexandria
 Patriarch of Antioch

References

Sources

External links